Human medical experiments in the United States:

 In general, see human subjects research
 Nonconsensual, see unethical human experimentation in the United States.

See also 
 guidelines for human subject research
 Common Rule